Karol Karlík (born 29 June 1986) is a Slovak footballer who plays as a defensive midfielder, most recently for MFK Skalica.

External links
FC Vysočina Jihlava profile

References

1986 births
Living people
Sportspeople from Nitra
Slovak footballers
Slovak expatriate footballers
Association football midfielders
FC Nitra players
FC ViOn Zlaté Moravce players
FC Vysočina Jihlava players
ASC Oțelul Galați players
Chemnitzer FC players
Spartak Myjava players
MFK Skalica players
Slovak Super Liga players
2. Liga (Slovakia) players
Czech First League players
Liga I players
3. Liga players
Slovak expatriate sportspeople in the Czech Republic
Slovak expatriate sportspeople in Romania
Slovak expatriate sportspeople in Germany
Expatriate footballers in the Czech Republic
Expatriate footballers in Romania
Expatriate footballers in Germany